Lauber is a surname, and may refer to:

 Albert G. Lauber (born 1950), judge of the United States Tax Court
 Anne Lauber (born 1943), Canadian composer, conductor and music educator
 Dezső Lauber (1879–1966), Hungarian all-round sportsman and architect
 Friederike Lauber (1937–1996), Austrian table tennis player
 Ken Lauber (born 1941), American composer and musician
 Manfred Lauber of the duo Wolfgang Werlé and Manfred Lauber, German half-brothers convicted of murder
 Maria Lauber (1891–1973), Swiss writer
 Marius Lauber (born 1990), German musician
 Patricia Lauber (1924–2010), American author

See also
 Lauber Arboretum in Kakabeka Falls, Ontario